JWH-051 is an analgesic drug which is a cannabinoid agonist. Its chemical structure is closely related to that of the potent cannabinoid agonist HU-210, with the only difference being the removal of the hydroxyl group at position 1 of the aromatic ring. It was discovered and named after John W. Huffman.

JWH-051 retains high affinity for the CB1 receptor, but is a much stronger agonist for CB2, with a Ki value of 14nM at CB2 vs 19nM at CB1. It was one of the first CB2-selective ligands developed, although its selectivity for CB2 is modest compared to newer compounds such as HU-308.

It has similar effects to other cannabinoid agonists such as sedation and analgesia, but with a relatively strong antiinflammatory effect due to its strong activity at CB2.

References 

JWH cannabinoids
Benzochromenes
Primary alcohols